"With You" is a song by English singer Jay Sean, featuring American rappers Gucci Mane and Asian Doll, from Sean's upcoming fifth studio album. The song was released on 8 March 2019.

Background
It is Sean's first release under the label Republic. Sean re-signed with Republic after he left Cash Money in 2014.

Music video
A lyric video of the song was released on YouTube on 7 March 2019. A music video was released on 23 April 2019.

Charts

Release history

References

2019 singles
Jay Sean songs
Gucci Mane songs
2019 songs
Songs written by Jay Sean
Songs written by Gucci Mane